The United Nations Youth and Students Association of Austria (UNYSA-Austria) - Academic Forum for Foreign Affairs (AFA) was founded on January 22, 1991, and is the Austrian non-partisan organization for young people, students, and graduates interested in international issues. UNYSA-Austria is the independent youth-organization of UNA-Austria, member of the Austrian national youth-council and also a founding member of the United Nations Youth Associations Network (UNYANET).

UNYSA-Austria has 4000 members in Austria and over 2500 affiliates all over the world. Membership is open to anyone interested below the age of 35. All activities of UNYSA-Austria are organized by 120 active members on a voluntary basis. The range of activities are lectures, discussions, trainings, debates and Model United Nations, all about international relations, foreign policy or about the United Nations. The events are being organized and held by the local branches in Vienna, Graz, Linz, Salzburg, Innsbruck and Eisenstadt. Nationwide projects are organized by the federal board of UNYSA-Austria.

Prominent former active members of UNYSA-Austria or its predecessor the "Academic Union for Foreign Affairs" (AVA) are e.g. Ewald Nowotny or Kurt Waldheim.

VIMUN 
The biggest and most prestigious event organized by UNYSA-Austria is the Vienna International Model United Nations (VIMUN). This international conference, which is the only one of its kind in Austria, has been taking place every beginning of August since 1995. Although with approximately 250 participants from around 40 different nations VIMUN is not one of the largest Model United Nations worldwide, it is the only one where the entire conference is taking place at offices of the UN. At the conference, various UN committees such as the Security Council, the Human Rights Council (HRC), the United Nations Office on Drugs and Crime (UNODC), the United Nations Industrial Development Organization (UNIDO), or the International Atomic Energy Agency (IAEA) are simulated very authentically, using the actual rules of procedure of the UN. Each participant represents one country with the aim of asserting its national interests in the committee. Besides extensive negotiations over the period of four days, different social programs are offered every day. Social programs may vary from a dinner at a typical Austrian “Heurigen”, a reception at the city hall of Vienna hosted by the mayor of Vienna, a reception at the famous Spanish Riding School of Vienna, or a clubbing at a fashionable disco in Vienna.

Global View 
The Global View Magazine is a joint project, published by UNYSA-Austria and UNA-Austria, and is a discussion platform for everyone interested in international relations, foreign policy and the United Nations. It is published four times a year and contains articles in German and English language, written by experts as well as by young graduates and students.

Special Projects of AFA-Vienna

Global Advancement Programme (GAP) 
The Global Advancement Programme (GAP) is an advancement programme for students. It includes a two-semester course, which contains practical experiences, strategies and perspectives of (former) members of the Austrian government, (former) top diplomats and experts from business, economy, media and more. The programme closes with a diploma and a publication called GAP-Journal.

Vienna MUN Club (VMC) 
The Vienna Model UN Club stimulates global awareness and diplomacy by organizing simulations of Security Council meetings on a fortnightly basis. Special emphasis is laid on introducing newcomers to the framework of both the United Nations System, as well as to that of Model United Nations. What is more, the VMC undertakes various study trips to MUN conferences all around the world, the most prestigious of which have been WorldMUN, CUIMUN at Cambridge University, OXIMUN at the University of Oxford, and Paris International MUN - PIMUN.

Debattierclub (DC) 
In 2004 Afa held its first debate club, one of the earliest in Austria. Since then debate clubs have been founded in several Austrian cities, and the Afa Debattierclub in Vienna is one of the two largest in the country (together with Debattierklub Wien.) 2012 it hosted the German Debating Championships.

References

External links 
 United Nations Youth and Students Association of Austria (ger./en.)
 Vienna International Model United Nations (en.)
 Global View Magazine (ger.)

Charities based in Austria
Austria
Austria and the United Nations